Kaustinen Folk Music Festival, celebrated yearly in July in Kaustinen, Finland, is the biggest folk music and dance festival in the Nordic countries. It was first celebrated in 1968. The festival originated in showcasing the famous local fiddle-based music tradition, which has continued uninterrupted 250 or more years, and is still the emotional core of the event. Finland has decided to propose the Kaustinen tradition into Unesco Representative List of Intangible Cultural Heritage spring 2020.

In its first year, the festival expected 6,000 visitors. The number was over three times the estimate, though. Nowadays the festival lasts a whole week and hosts 40,000–50,000 visits per year. Besides Finnish and international professional performers, 4,000–5,000 amateurs, forming 400–500 groups, participate the festival yearly. Over 1,000 scheduled performances in almost 30 venues and stages are given yearly, and dozens of workshops and other participatory programs are offered.

Since 1970 the festival has nominated yearly one or more persons as Master Folk Musician, Master Folk Singer or Master Folk Dancer, on the basis of their repertoire, skills and work for keeping up the traditions, as well as an Ensemble of the Year. These nominations are highly valued in Finnish folk music and dance community.

The festival is organized since 2012 by Pro Kaustinen Society, which is formed by three Kaustinen tradition bearers' organizations.

The Peanuts comic strip bird Woodstock, named for the rock music festival in Woodstock, New York, is called Kaustinen in Finnish with obvious reference to this folk music festival.

References

External links 
 
 Kaustinen Folk Music Festival

Folk Music Festival
Music festivals in Finland
Dance festivals in Finland
Recurring events established in 1968
Tourist attractions in Central Ostrobothnia
Folk festivals in Finland
Music festivals established in 1968
Summer events in Finland